ZiS (Russian: Zavod imeni Stalina, 'Factory named for Stalin') may refer to:

 Zavod imeni Likhacheva of Moscow, formerly Automotive Factory No. 2 Zavod imeni Stalina, and its products:
 ZIS-101 limousine
 ZIS-110 limousine
 ZIS-150
 ZIS-151 General-purpose truck
 ZIS-152 (BTR-152) armoured personnel carrier
 ZIS-154 - transit bus
 ZIS-155 - transit bus
 Artillery Factory No. 92, Zavod imeni Stalina of Gorky, and its products:
 ZiS-2 57mm antitank gun
 ZiS-3 76.2mm divisional gun
 ZiS-5 76.2mm tank gun (version of the F-34 tank gun)
 ZiS-30 self-propelled antitank gun
 ZiS-S-53 85mm tank gun

Companies of the Soviet Union